Elixir Group (full legal name: D.o.o za proizvodnju, promet i usluge Elixir Group Šabac) is a Serbian agribusiness company. It is headquartered in Šabac, Serbia.

History
Founded on May 16, 1990, Elixir Group has since grew from a family company to one of the biggest Serbian companies in the field of agribusiness, fertilizing and the wholesale of other agriculture products. In the beginning, the company had 3 subsidiaries, Elixir Agrar, Elixir Feed and Elixir Food.

By the end of 2011, Elixir Group bought once a great Yugoslavian fertilizer company, Zorka Šabac, with the plans to rebuild a ruined processing capacities.
On July 16, 2012, the company bought the main part of Negotin-based bankrupt company IHP Prahovo for 4 million euros. The company's main activity is producing phosphor components. In the first year of the company acquisition, Elixir Group invested more than 4.5 million euros, with plans of 25 million euros in the investments until 2015.

In May 2013, Elixir Zorka, a subsidiary of Elixir Group, opened a new fertilization facility, worth 30 million euros.

In June 2017, a French agribusiness company "Le Groupe Roullier" invested in Elixir's factory of monocalcium phosphate.

Social responsibility
During the 2014 floodings in Serbia, the company donated 100 million dinars.

See also
 Agriculture in Serbia

References

External links
 
 

Agriculture companies of Serbia
Companies based in Šabac
Agriculture companies established in 1990
D.o.o. companies in Serbia
Holding companies of Serbia
Serbian companies established in 1990